Mark Hamilton is a British lead guitarist who played for UK rock band Quench, (ICC Records) (on hiatus since 2009) .  He has also played for Warner Bros' Top 40 artist Doug Walker and features on Doug's debut album Fear Together (2009) (produced by Danton Supple – producer of Coldplay's X&Y etc.) as well as ex Dum Dums frontman Josh Doyle in the US, Vicky Beeching and Martyn Layzell (Survivor Records).  He has also appeared with various other artists for TV and recording sessions including Italian superstar Elisa, on the same bill as Destiny's Child at an MTV Live event. He also joined Josh Doyle's band on his UK tour in 2009. Current projects include King Awesome, a tribute to late 80s 'Hair Metal' and rock covers band Inner City Sumo (named after a failed Alan Partridge TV show pitch!).

His nickname 'Magic' originates from a Doug Walker radio session on Dermot O'Leary's BBC Radio 2 show, where O'Leary referred to Hamilton as 'Magic' after misreading his name on a handwritten note.

Other projects Mark has been linked to include Breakbeat/Punk/Thrash band Psalmistry, pop band TVB and comedy 70s Funk/Disco covers band The Mojo Collective.

Biography
Mark Hamilton was born in Truro, Cornwall, England and lived in Newquay, Cornwall for the first few years of his life.  His family then moved to Alton, Hampshire where at the age of 16 he taught himself to play guitar.  His first real taste of playing in bands was on The University of Exeter band scene, where he won the award for best guitarist two years running at the Battle of the Bands competition.  He graduated from Exeter University with a Law Degree, a qualification he has never used as he has played guitar professionally since graduating. He has lived much of his adult life in Oxford and has also been involved in the Oxford music scene.  Mark also has a Diploma in Contemporary Music (with Honours) from the Academy of Contemporary Music (Guildford).

Equipment
Guitars:
 Fender USA Strat Plus (customised with his trademark mirror scratchplate, Graphtech Ghost piezo saddles and pre-amp, and a Seymour Duncan Hot Rails pick-up with coil tap)
 Fender USA Standard Telecaster
 Taylor 314CE
 Gibson Les Paul Standard
 Gibson Firebird Studio
 Charvel Satchel Signature Model
 Charvel DK24 Okoume
 Plexi-glass Ibanez Jem replica
 ESP/LTD Kirk Hammett KH-602 Purple Sparkle
 
Effects:
 Strymon Dig, BlueSky
 Line 6: DL4, FM4,
 MXR EVH Phase 90
 Seabro Tubestation Talk Box
 Ibanez TS9DX,
 Boss TU-2, OC-2, TR-2
 Jim Dunlop Cry Baby
 TC Electronic Sub, Corona Chorus, Tuner Noir
 Digitech Freqout
 Ebow Plus

Amplifiers:
 Mesa/Boogie MKV Head
 Mesa/Boogie Lonestar Special 2X12 Combo
 Mesa/Boogie 2X12 and 4X12 Rectifier Cabinets
 Kemper Stage

Endorsements:
Mesa/Boogie, Line 6, Picato Musicians Strings, Pedal Train Cases.

Discography
 Route 66 (live) by Vicky Beeching (Spring Harvest) (2011)
 High School Soldier (on the Values and Virtues EP) by Josh Doyle (2009)
 Fear Together by Doug Walker (2009)
 Reality Radio by Quench (2008)
 Stand in Awe (live) by Martyn Layzell and St Aldates (2006)
 One God (live) by Martyn Layzell (Spring Harvest) (2006)
 Heavenbound (live) by Martyn Layzell (New Wine) (2006)
 Dredd vs Death OST PlayStation/Xbox/PC game (2003)
 Afterglow by Quench (2003)
 Barnroom Demos by Entrace Thesis (Josh Doyle) (2002)
 Mandora EP by Mandora (2003)
 Icons Be Bygones by Ripcord (2001)
 Number One Superguy by Numberone Superguy (2000)
 Rumpus Room by Ripcord (2000)
 What About Us by TVB (1997)

Plus guest appearances on recordings by Psalmistry and Freeslave

References

External links
The official Mark Hamilton website
Josh Doyle's Official Website
Quench Facebook Page
King Awesome's Official Website

English rock guitarists
Living people
People from Truro
People from Newquay
People from Alton, Hampshire
Alumni of the University of Exeter
Year of birth missing (living people)